The Denbury Crinoidal Limestone is a geologic formation in England. It preserves fossils dating back to the Devonian period.

See also

 List of fossiliferous stratigraphic units in England

References
 

Geologic formations of England
Devonian System of Europe
Devonian England
Limestone formations